Piazza Cesare Beccaria is a square of Florence located on the viali di Circonvallazione, the boulevard along the route of the former walls of Florence.

History
The piazza was designed by the architect Giuseppe Poggi when Florence became briefly the Capital of Kingdom of Italy; in 1876, it was named in honour of Cesare Bonesana marchese di Beccaria.

This place originally was called Piazza alla Croce due to the Porta alla Croce, still present, the former gate of the medieval walls. A number of concave neoclassical palaces were built around the square.

On the square, at the bifurcation of the Giovine Italia and Amendola boulevards, is the building that hosts the State Archives, where until 1977 was the Casa della Gioventù Italiana del Littorio of Florence.

In 2003 - 2004, a three-story underground parking garage was built under the square .

Gallery

References
 

Beccaria
1865 establishments